Mara Rockliff (born 1970) is an American author of nonfiction and educational books for children. The American Library Association selected her book Gingerbread for Liberty! as an ALA Notable Children's Book. She also received the Golden Kite Award for Me and Momma and Big John.

Early life 
She attended Brown University where she joined the social and literary fraternity St. Anthony Hall. After college during her twenties, she lived in New York City.

Career 
Rockliff specializes in historical picture books for children, especially true stories about people that are not included in traditional histories. For example, she has written books about the female magician Adelaide Herrmann, pioneering film-maker Alice Guy Blaché, World War II engineer Beatrice Shilling, and Georgia Gilmore who helped feed participants in Montgomery bus boycott. Rockliff was inspired to write Born to Swing: Lil Hardin Armstrong's Life in Jazz when she realized female musicians were left out of the history of jazz music.

Rockliff considers herself a "research geek." She studies interviews, newspapers, oral histories, and primary source materials to create her books, and also includes a list of primary sources in her history books. Rockwell got the idea to write Try It! How Frieda Caplan Changed the Way We Eat when looking through the Jewish Women's Archive. She said, "I realized that out of all these books I've never done one about a Jewish woman, even though I'm a Jewish woman. That seemed like an oversight." Frieda Caplan founded a specialty produce company and introduced foods such as kiwis, baby carrots, mushrooms, sugar snap peas, spaghetti squash, and mangos to consumers in the United States. Rockliff worked with Caplan's daughter to create Try It! which was selected as a 2021 Eureka! Excellence in Nonfiction Award Honor Title by the California Reading Association. It was also selected by Smithsonian magazine as one of the ten best children's books of 2021.

In 2013, Rockliff was nominated for the Ezra Jack Keats Book Award for her book My Heart Will Not Sit Down. The picture book is about a young girl in Cameroon who tried to raise money to help those who are starving in New York City during the Great Depression. A reviewer noted that My Heart Will Not Sit Down "may motivate youngsters to find their own ways to help people in need."

That same year, her book Me and Momma and Big John was nominated for the Charlotte Zolotow Award and won the Golden Kite Award from the Society of Children's Book Writers and Illustrators. The Charlotte Zolotow Award is the highest honor for writing in children's picture books. The book is about an African American female stonecutter who helped build the Cathedral of St. John the Divine in New York City in the 1970s. The New York Times noted, "This is the rare children's book that shows how a building is built with less of an emphasis on cranes and bulldozers and more on the difficult work of laboring hands. But it's not only about the grueling hardness of labor, Me and Momma and Big John is also about the rewards of a labor of love, and of a job well done."

In 2016, Rockliff's Gingerbread for Liberty: How a German Baker Helped Win the American Revolution was selected as an ALA Notable Children's Book. The book is about Christopher Ludwick, a Philadelphia baker who was too old and portly to fight in the Revolutionary War, but supported General George Washington's army by baking bread for the troops. Rockliff learned of Ludwick in a 1964 magazine article about Pennsylvania Dutch cooking traditions. She says, "That grabbed me right away since it combined fun stuff for kids—sneaky secret agent, gingerbread—with fun historical stuff for parents and teachers. Also, I live in a very German part of Pennsylvania, and my daughter has Hessian ancestors on her father's side, so the topic had special interest to me." Gingerbread for Liberty also won the Garden State Children's Book Award  and the Land of Enchantment Book Award.

Also in 2016, her book Mesmerized: How Ben Franklin Solved a Mystery that Baffled All of France was selected as an Orbis Pictus Award Honor Book by the National Council of Teachers of English. It also won the Cook Prize from the Bank Street College of Education. The book tells how Benjamin Franklin used the scientific method to debunk the mysterious powers of Franz Mesmer's magic wand. One reviewer noted, "Although the book sounds heavy with facts and theories, the story zips along thanks to Mara Rockliff's lively, dramatic writing that holds even young readers in thrall." A more recent book, 2020's Jefferson Measures a Moose, tells how another founding father, Thomas Jefferson, used math counter misinformation in a book about animals found in the United States. Rockliff says, " I'd just published Mesmerized: How Ben Franklin Solved a Mystery that Baffled All of France, and I thought this story could do for math and measurement what Mesmerized did for the scientific method." In addition, she was exploring the concept of misinformation through the lens of current events in 2020.

In 2017, the National Council for the Social Studies (NCSS) and the Children's Book Council (CBC) selected her book, Around America to Win the Vote: Two Suffragists, a Kitten, and 10,000 Miles, as a Notable Trade Book for Young People. The NCSS-CBC book review committee selected "books that emphasize human relations, represent a diversity of groups and are sensitive to a broad range of cultural experiences, present an original theme or a fresh slant on a traditional topic, are easily readable and of high literary quality, have a pleasing format, and, where appropriate, include illustrations that enrich the text." Around America to Win the Vote was about Alice Burke and Nell Richardson who drove across the United States in 1916, speaking in 26 states to increase support for women’s suffrage.

In 2020, Rockliff's book Doctor Esperanto and the Language of Hope was chosen by the Association of Jewish Libraries for the Sydney Taylor Book Award as a Notable Picture Book. The book is about L. L. Zamenhoff who invented the universal language of Esperanto to bring people together.

Rockliff also wrote the twelve books of the Milo and Jazz Mysteries series using the pen name Lewis B. Montgomery. Booklist selected The Case of the Stinky Socks from the Milo and Jazz series for “100 Best Children’s and YA Mysteries of the Past 10 Years." The second book in the series, The Case of the Poisoned Pig, was nominated for an Agatha Award. One reviewer notes that these books have "the brief chapters, which are filled with earnest, clever kids being funny—and, more importantly, smart."

Rockliff also uses the pen names Eleanor May and as Nan Walker, most notably writing books for the Mouse Math series which now includes more than fifteen titles. The Mouse Math series presents "basic concepts, thinking skills, and reading skills all wrapped up in engaging stories starring mouse siblings Wanda and Albert." Albert the Muffin Maker was the 2014 Moonbeam Children's Book Awards Bronze Medalist for Alphabet/Counting.

As May and Walker, Rockcliff has also written books for other educational series, including Math Matters, Science Solves It!, and Social Studies Connects.

Awards 
 2011 Green Earth Book Award Honor Book for Get Real: What Kind of World Are You Buying?
 2013 Ezra Jack Keats Book Award Honor for My Heart Will Not Sit Down
 2013 Golden Kite Award for Me and Momma and Big John
 2013 Charlotte Zolotow Award Honor for Me and Momma and Big John
 2014 Moonbeam Children's Book Awards Bronze Medalist Alphabet/Counting for Albert the Muffin Maker
 2015 Anne Izard Storytellers' Choice Award for The Grudge Keepers
 2016 Cook Prize for Mesmerized: How Ben Franklin Solved a Mystery that Baffled All of France
 2016 Orbis Pictus Award Honor book for Mesmerized: How Ben Franklin Solved a Mystery that Baffled All of France
 2016 ALA Notable Children's Book for Gingerbread for Liberty: How a German Baker Helped Win the American Revolution
 2017 National Council for the Social Studies-Children's Book Council Notable Trade Books for Young People for Around America to Win the Vote: Two Suffragists, a Kitten, and 10,000 Miles
 2018 Garden State Children's Book Award for Gingerbread for Liberty: How a German Baker Helped Win the American Revolution
 2018 Land of Enchantment Book Award for Gingerbread for Liberty: How a German Baker Helped Win the American Revolution
 2020 Notable Picture Book, Sydney Taylor Book Award, Association of Jewish Libraries for Doctor Esperanto and the Language of Hope
 2021 Eureka! Excellence in Nonfiction Award Honor Title for Try It!: How Frieda Caplan Changed the Way We Eat

Publications

As Mara Rockliff 

 Pieces of Another World. Arbordale Publishing, 2005. 
 Next to an Ant. Rookie Readers, 2008. 
 Get Real: What Kind of World are YOU Buying? Running Press Kids, 2010. 
 The Busiest Street in Town. Knopf Books for Young Readers, 2012. 
 Me and Momma and Big John. Candlewick, 2012. 
 My Heart Will Not Sit Down. Knopf Books for Young Readers, 2012. 
 The Grudge Keeper. Peachtree, 2014. 
 Gingerbread for Liberty: How a German Baker Helped Win the American Revolution. Clarion Books, 2015. 
 Chik Chak Shabbat. Candlewick, 2016. 
 Anything But Ordinary Addie: The True Story of Adelaide Herrmann, Queen of Magic. Candlewick, 2016. 
 Mesmerized: How Ben Franklin Solved a Mystery that Baffled All of France. Candlewick, 2017. 
 Born to Swing: Lil Hardin Armstrong's Life in Jazz. Calkins Creek, 2017. 
 Lights! Camera! Alice!: The Thrilling True Adventures of the First Woman Filmmaker. Chronicle Books, 2018. 
 Around America to Win the Vote: Two Suffragists, a Kitten, and 10,000 Miles. Candlewick, 2019. 
 Billie Jean!: How Tennis Star Billie Jean King Changed Women's Sports. G.P. Putnam’s Sons Books, 2019. 
 Doctor Esperanto and the Language of Hope. Candlewick, 2019. 
 Jefferson Measures a Moose. Candlewick, 2020. 
 The Girl Who Could Fix Anything: Beatrice Shilling, World War II Engineer. Candlewick, 2021. 
 Try It!: How Frieda Caplan Changed the Way We Eat. Beach Lane Books, 2021. 
 Sweet Justice: Georgia Gilmore and the Montgomery Bus Boycott. Random House Studios, 2022.  
 A Perfect Fit: How Lena "Lane" Bryant Changed the Shape of Fashion. Clarion Books, 2022.

As Lewis B. Montgomery 

 The Case of the Stinky Socks (Milo & Jazz Mysteries #1), Kane Press, 2009, 
 The Case of the Poisoned Pig (Milo & Jazz Mysteries #2), Kane Press, 2009, 
 The Case of the Haunted Haunted House (Milo & Jazz Mysteries #3) Kane Press, 2009, 
 The Case of the Amazing Zelda (Milo & Jazz Mysteries #4), Kane Press, 2009. 
 The Case of the July 4th Jinx (Milo & Jazz Mysteries #5), Kane Press, 2010, 
 The Case of the Missing Moose (Milo & Jazz Mysteries #6), Kane Press, 2011, 
 The Case of the Purple Pool (Milo & Jazz Mysteries #7), Kane Press, 2011, 
 The Case of the Diamonds in the Desk (Milo & Jazz Mysteries #8), Kane Press, 2012, 
 The Case of the Crooked Campaign (Milo & Jazz Mysteries #9), Kane Press, 2012, 
 The Case of the Superstar Scam (Milo & Jazz Mysteries #10), Kane Press, 2013 
 The Case of the Locked Box (Milo & Jazz Mysteries #11), Kane Press, 2013, 
 The Case of the Buried Bones (Milo & Jazz Mysteries #12), Kane Press, 2014,

As Eleanor May 

 Real Me – Lib. Tandem Library, 2006. 
 Ty's Triple Trouble. Kane Press 2007. 
 The Great Shape-Up (Science Solves It) Kane Press, 2007. 
 Mac & Cheese, Pleeeeze! (Math Matters) Kane Press, 2008. 
 The Greatest Thing Ever. Catapult Learning, 2008. 
 A Visit From the King. Catapult Learning, 2008. 
 Keesha's Bright Idea. Astra Publishing, 2009. 
 Who Needs It? (Social Studies Connects), Kane Press, 2009. 
 The Best Mother's Day Ever (Social Studies Connects), Kane Press, 2010, 
 Albert's Amazing Snail (Mouse Math) Kane Press, 2012, 
 The Mousier the Merrier (Mouse Math) Kane Press, 2012 
 Albert Is Not Scared (Mouse Math) Kane Press, 2013, 
 Albert's Bigger than Big Idea (Mouse Math) Kane Press, 2013, 
 A Beach for Albert (Mouse Math) Kane Press, 2013, 
 Mice of Ice (Mouse Math) Kane Press, 2013, 
 Count Off, Squeak Scouts! (Mouse Math) Kane Press, 2013. 
 Albert the Muffin Maker (Mouse Math) Kane Press, 2014, 
 Messy Mouse (Mouse Math) Kane Press, 2014. 
 Albert Adds Up (Mouse Math) Kane Press, 2014. 
 Albert Starts School (Mouse Math) Kane Press, 2015, 
 Lost in the Mouseum (Mouse Math) Kane Press, 2015, 
 Albert Helps Out (Mouse Math) Kane Press, 2017, 
 Albert Doubles the Fun (Mouse Math) Kane Press, 2017, 
 Where's Albert? (Mouse Math) Kane Press, 2017, 
 Let's Go, Snow! (Math Matters), Kane Press, 2017, 
 Who Needs It (Social Studies Connects) Kane Press, 2021,

As Nan Walker 

 We Fish. Benchmark, 2004. 
 Stressbusters: Producers & Consumers. Kane Press, 2006. 
 Check It Out! Historical Evidence. Kane Press, 2006. 
 The Bay School Blogger (Social Studies Connects) Kane Press, 2008. 
 Follow That Clue! (Community Helpers) Kane Press, 2008. 
 The Yum Yum House (Math Matters), Kane Press, 2009, 
 The Messiest Room on the Planet (Social Studies Connects) with Monica Kulling. Kane Press, 2009. 
 Old School, New School. Benchmark Education Company, 2010. 
 Rain Forest Food. Benchmark Education Company, 2010. 
 Day Camp. Benchmark Education Company, 2011. 
 Thanksgiving Now and Then. Benchmark Education Company, 2011. 
 On the Acronym and Initialization Assembly Line (Readers Theater World Plays)  Benchmark Education Company, 2012. 
 Simile Ella (Readers Theater World Plays) Benchmark Education Company, 2012. 
 Our Nature Chart. JY Books, 2014. 
 Spork Out of Orbit (How to be an Earthling 1), Kane Press, 2016, 
 Otto and the New Girl (Math Matters), Kane Press, 2017, 
 The Midnight Kid (Science Solves It!), Kane Press, 2017,

Personal 
Rockliff is Jewish. Rockliff lives with her family in Lancaster, Pennsylvania. She is an avid baker and usually includes baked goods in her books. Starting in 2014, she learned Esperanto and uses it daily to talk with people around the world.

References 

1970 births
Living people
Brown University alumni
St. Anthony Hall
American women children's writers
American non-fiction children's writers
20th-century American women writers
American women biographers
Jewish women writers
Jewish American non-fiction writers
Writers from Lancaster, Pennsylvania
American bakers
Writers of Esperanto literature
Esperanto speaking Jews
American Esperantists